Pype Hayes is a modern housing estate area in the east of the Erdington district of Birmingham.  It is within the Tyburn ward. Covering the postcodes of B24 and B76.

Etymology
The name of the area derives from a major landowner in Erdington called Henry de Pipe. On this land he built a house which later developed into Pype Hayes Hall.

History
Pype Hayes developed mainly during the 20th century as a result of the expansion of Erdington northwards towards the Chester Road.

The Chester Road follows the line of the ancient drover's road called the Welsh Road. It developed during the 17th century as a major thoroughfare through Birmingham. Stage coaches used the road and it developed a reputation as a haven for highwaymen.

All the land in Pype Hayes was owned as part of an estate with Pype Hayes Hall at its centre. This was a prominent hall in the area and the nearest settlement was Holifast Grange to the north-west. The construction of the Birmingham and Fazeley Canal in the south of Erdington prompted the establishment of industries near Tyburn, which is close to Pype Hayes. However, Pype Hayes remained unaffected by the industry.

In the 20th century, Pype Hayes became the focus of residential developments for the expanding Erdington area. Also, the public wanted houses so that they could live near their workplaces at Tyburn. Eachelhurst Road was selected as a main housing development location. As Eachelhurst Road was on the boundary of Pype Hayes, the area remained relatively untouched. The houses were constructed between World War I and World War II and were of a semi-detached style. They were constructed of concrete and steel.

The areas surrounding Pype Hayes developed quickly. Walmley in Sutton Coldfield expanded massively and Castle Vale to the south-east became a major industrial area with the construction of a large aerodrome. The landowners lost power within the area and so the Chester Road became developed. During the war, Pype Hayes was bombed, however, this was mainly haphazard bombing aimed at Erdington. Walmley Ash, nearby to Pype Hayes, witnessed 70-80 bombs being dropped on the area in just one night.

Pype Hayes was extensively developed for council housing in the 1920s, as Birmingham City Council had recently started a huge process of rehousing people from inner city slums. More than 1,300 homes were built at Pype Hayes on land between Chester Road and Tyburn Road, with concrete walls and steel subframes – typical Dunlop Boswell style.

The first school opened on the estate in 1928 – Paget Council School, which had capacity for 824 pupils aged 5–15 years. Gunter Road Council School was added in 1930 for 432 children aged 5–11 years, with wooden huts being added in 1930 and even the hall of St Mary's Church being used as an annex from 1952 to 1954 to cope with increased pupil numbers.

By the 1980s, most of the houses at Pype Hayes were plagued with "concrete cancer" – a structural defect which renders buildings beyond repair. As with many large council housing estates, car crime, drugs, burglaries and "hooligan" behaviour were becoming a widespread problem. Also demolished as the Norton public house, which was replaced by a supermarket.

It was soon decided that the defective homes all had to be demolished, and in 1992 the Pype Hayes Regeneration Programme began.

Several tower blocks were built on Pype Hayes during the 1960s, as part of further rehousing from inner city slums, but these homes were no better than the older ones in the area, despite being some 40 years newer. They too would have to be demolished.

On 7 July 2005 the council approved the demolition of properties 189-235 Pype Hayes Road, which were built by Dunlop Boswell. Demolition cost an estimated £60,000. The last houses to be were demolished were around 2010–2011. The twelfth and final phase of the regeneration was approved by the Cabinet on 27 October 2003. The successful tender submission by Barratt Homes and Prime Focus was then approved in 2002. Most of the properties in Pype Hayes were demolished, with the exception of Sorrel House which was retained and refurbished, and were replaced with a modern housing development.  The regeneration of Pype Hayes continues with Persimmon Homes completing the final phase in 2009, ending the estate's regeneration process which had lasted 17 years.

Features and facilities

Pype Hayes Hall remains today and was auctioned by Birmingham City Council in February 2012. It is now in private hands. The hall was sold in November 2013 for £25,000 to private investors with plans to create a hotel and leisure complex. As of November 2019 the hall still lies derelict with no development. Surrounding the hall is a  park called Pype Hayes Park which hosts a funfair and used to be the site for a large City Council funded bonfire and firework display to celebrate Guy Fawkes Night. This has not been held for a number of years due to cuts in City resources. Adjacent to the park is Pype Hayes Golf Course, which was opened in 1933. The two are separated by Plants Brook which flows beneath the Eachelhurst Road. At the Eachelhurst Road – Chester Road junction was a pub called The Bagot Arms. This closed in 2019. An arson attack on the pub during on 5 August 2021 resulted in devastation of the pub building and the likelihood of the building now being demolished and the site cleared for apartments.

The parish church for Pype Hayes is St Mary's Church, which opened in 1929.

Transport
The A38 passes through the area. The road is used by several National Express West Midlands services which travel through Stockland Green to the Aston Expressway, or travel in opposite directions into Sutton Coldfield, Erdington, Walmley and Castle Bromwich.

There are no rail facilities in the area, however, further up the Chester Road is Chester Road railway station on the Cross-City Line.  Also in close proximity are Erdington and Water Orton railway stations.

References

Further reading
The Story of Erdington – From Sleepy Hamlet to Thriving Suburb, Douglas V. Jones, 1989, Westwood Press

External links
Birmingham.gov.uk: Pype Hayes Park
Birmingham.gov.uk: Pype Hayes Golf Course
Pype Hayes Golf Club
Friends of Pype Hayes Park and Hall
Pype Hayes Hall
Kier: Pype Hayes Estate
The Church of England: St Mary's Church
Birminghamnet.co.uk: Pype Hayes photograph gallery

Areas of Birmingham, West Midlands